In Greek mythology, Aerope (Ancient Greek: Ἀερόπη) was a Cretan princess as the daughter of Catreus, king of Crete. She was the sister to Clymene, Apemosyne and Althaemenes. Aerope's father Catreus gave her to Nauplius, to be drowned, or sold abroad, but Nauplius spared her, and she became the wife of Atreus, or Pleisthenes, (or both?) and by most accounts the mother of Agamemnon and Menelaus. While the wife of Atreus, she became the lover of his brother Thyestes, and gave Thyestes the golden lamb, by which he became the king of Mycenae.

Family
Aerope's father was Catreus, the son of Minos, and king of Crete. Catreus had two other daughters, Clymene and Apemosyne, and a son Althaemenes.

According to most accounts, Aerope was the mother of Agamemnon and Menelaus, usually by Atreus, but sometimes Pleisthenes. According to some accounts, Aerope was instead the mother, by Atreus, of Pleisthenes, and when Pleisthenes died young, his sons, Agamemnon and Menelaus, were adopted by Atreus, or in others, Aerope was perhaps the wife of both Atreus and Pleisthenes, having married Atreus after Pleisthenes died, with Atreus adopting her children from the first marriage. Such accounts were perhaps attempts to reconcile separate traditions.

According to Hyginus, Aerope was the mother by Thyestes of two sons, Tantalus and Pleisthenes, and that these were the children that Atreus famously fed to Thyestes. According to some accounts Aerope was also the mother of a daughter Anaxibia.

Mythology

In Crete
According to the tradition followed by Euripides in his lost play  Cretan Women (Kressai), Catreus found Aerope in bed with a slave and handed her over to Nauplius to be drowned, but Nauplius spared Aerope's life and she married Pleisthenes. Sophocles, in his play Ajax, may also refer to Aerope's father Catreus finding her in bed with some man, and handing her over to Nauplius to be drowned, but the possibly corrupt text may instead refer to Aerope's husband Atreus finding her in bed with Thyestes, and having her drowned (see below).

However the mythographer Apollodorus followed a different tradition, with no mention of any sexual transgression. Catreus, having received an oracle saying that he would be killed by one of his children, gave Aerope and her sister Clymene to Nauplius to be sold off in foreign lands (Aerope's brother Althaemenes had found out about the prophecy and fearing that he would be the one to kill Catreus, took Aerope's other sister Apemosyne with him and fled Crete for Rhodes). Here too Aerope ends up as the wife of Pleisthenes.

In Mycenae
From Crete, Aerope was taken to Mycenae. There, while the wife of Atreus, she became the lover of Atreus' twin brother Thyestes and involved in the brothers' power struggle for the kingship of Mycenea, and their blood feud.

Atreus and Thyestes were the sons of Pelops and Hippodamia.  Their desire for their father's throne led to the murder of their half-brother Chrysippus, because of which they were banished, and sought refuge in Mycenae. When the Perseid dynasty came to an end, the Myceneans received an oracle saying they should choose  a son of Pelops as their king. Aerope stole the golden lamb (a portent linked to the kingship of Mycenae) from her husband Atreus and gave it to Thyestes, so that the Myceneans would choose Thyestes as their king.

From Byzantine period annotations to Euripides' Orestes we learn that, in some unspecified Sophocles work, Atreus cast Aerope into the sea in revenge for her adultery and theft of the golden lamb.

Sources

Early
Mentions of Aerope apparently occurred as early as "Homer" and "Hesiod". An Iliad scholium tells us that:
According to Homer, Agamemnon was the son of Pelops’ son Atreus, and his mother was Aerope; but according to Hesiod he was the son of Pleisthenes [and Aerope?].

Since Aerope is not in Homer's Iliad or Odyssey (where Agamemnon and Menelaus were the sons of Atreus, with no mother mentioned), the scholiast is presumably taking the Homeric reference from somewhere in the Epic Cycle, which was also attributed to Homer.

Fragmentary lines from the Hesiodic Catalogue of Women seem to make Aerope, (without naming a father) the mother of three sons Agamemnon, Menelaus (and Anaxibios?). While the Byzantine scholar John Tzetzes says that according to "Hesiod", Aerope was, by Atreus, the mother of Pleisthenes.

Fifth century BC
The story of Aerope, Atreus and Thyestes, was popular in Greek tragedy, however no complete plays on the story survive. Aeschylus' play Agamemnon, contains several obscure allusions to the story, which indicate that, by at least 458 BC, the story was well known. In that play, Cassandra hints at Aerope's affair with Thyestes, where he is referred to as "the one who defiled" his "brother's bed".

There are many references to Aerope in the plays of Euripides. She was apparently an important character in his lost tragedy Cretan Women. The play told how Aerope was "secretly violated by a servant", and that when her father discovered this, he gave her to Nauplius to be drowned, but instead Nauplius gave her in marriage to Pleisthenes.  According to the scholiast on Aristophanes' Frogs 849, her behavior in the play was "like a whore's". This, along with Euripides treatment of other "profligate women" suggests that the play dealt with Aerope's seduction of Thyestes, rather than Thyestes' seduction of Aerope. Although she was given to Pleisthenes as his wife, in his Cretan Women, in his plays Orestes, and Helen, Euripides  has Agamemnon and Menelaus as the sons of Aerope and Atreus. Also in his Orestes, he refers to the "treacherous love of Cretan Aerope in her treacherous marriage", while in his Electra, he tells us that Thyestes, "persuaded Atreus' own wife to secret love, and carried off to his house the portent; coming before the assembly he declared that he had in his house the horned sheep with fleece of gold." Euripides possibly also wrote a play Thyestes.

Sophocles, in his play Ajax, refers to Aerope being found in bed with a lover, and ordered drowned by someone's "father". As the text stands, the "father" is Aerope's, and the reference is to Catreus giving her to Nauplius to be drowned, as in Euripide's Cretan Women. However, a small "correction" to the text would make the father Agamemnon's, and the reference would then be to Atreus finding Aerope in bed with Thyestes. There were several other plays by Sophocles, all lost, which presumably also dealt with the story: Atreus, Thyestes (possibly more than one), and Thyestes in Sicyon.  Byzantine scholia to Euripides' Orestes 812, possibly referring to the passage from the Ajax noted above, say that in some (unnamed) play by Sophocles, Atreus "revenged himself on his wife Aerope (both because of her adultery with Thyestes and because she gave away the lamb) by casting her into the sea".

Agathon, wrote a play titled Aerope (and a Thyestes), and perhaps so did the younger Carcinus. We are told that in some such play,  Alexander of Pherai was moved to tears by the performance of the actor Theodorus as Aerope, suggesting a sympathetic portrayal.

Late
The Roman mythographer Hyginus, has Agamemnon as the son of Aerope and Atreus, and Tantalus and Plethenes as the sons of Aerope and Thyestes, with these being the children that Atreus fed to Thyestes.
 
In Ovid's Ars Amatoria, Aerope is given as one of several examples showing that "women's lust", is "keener" than men's and having "more of madness":
Had the Cretan woman abstained from love for Thyestes (and is it such a feat to be able to do without a particular man?), Phoebus had not broken off in mid-career, and wresting his car about turned round his steeds to face the dawn.

The mythographer Apollodorus gives the following account:
Catreus, son of Minos, had three daughters, Aerope, Clymene, and Apemosyne, and a son, Althaemenes. When Catreus inquired of the oracle how his life should end, the god said that he would die by the hand of one of his children. ... And Catreus gave Aerope and Clymene to Nauplius to sell into foreign lands; and of these two Aerope became the wife of Plisthenes, who begat Agamemnon and Menelaus.

However elsewhere he says that Agamemnon and Menelaus were the sons of Aerope and Atreus and that
the wife of Atreus was Aerope, daughter of Catreus, and she loved Thyestes. And Atreus once vowed to sacrifice to Artemis the finest of his flocks; but when a golden lamb appeared, they say that he neglected to perform his vow, and having choked the lamb, he deposited it in a box and kept it there, and Aerope gave it to Thyestes, by whom she had been debauched.

Similarities with Auge and Danae
The stories told about Aerope, share elements with those told about Auge and Danae. These elements include, foretold killings, sexual impurity by daughters, and their subsequent punishment by their fathers, by being cast into the sea, or given away to be sold overseas.

Auge was the daughter of Aleus, king of Tegea, and the mother of the hero Telephus. According to one version of the story, Aleus had received an oracle that his sons would be killed by the son of Auge, so Aleus made Auge a priestess of Athena, requiring her to remain a virgin on pain of death. Nevertheless, she became pregnant by Heracles. Then, by various accounts, she was either cast into the sea, or given to Nauplius to be either drowned or sold overseas, however in all these accounts she ended up in Mysia as the wife of King Teuthras.

Danae was the daughter of Acrisius, king of Argos, and the mother of the hero Perseus. An oracle told Acrisius that he would be killed by the son of Danae, so he locked her away. Nevertheless, Danae became pregnant, by Zeus according to most accounts, and was cast into the sea by her father, but survived through the intercession of Zeus.

Notes

References
 Aeschylus, Agamemnon in Aeschylus, with an English translation by Herbert Weir Smyth, Ph. D. in two volumes, Vol 2, Cambridge, Massachusetts, Harvard University Press, 1926, Online version at the Perseus Digital Library.
 Apollodorus, The Library with an English Translation by Sir James George Frazer, F.B.A., F.R.S. in 2 Volumes, Cambridge, MA, Harvard University Press; London, William Heinemann Ltd. 1921. ISBN 0-674-99135-4. Online version at the Perseus Digital Library. Greek text available from the same website.
 Armstrong, Rebecca, Cretan Women: Pasiphae, Ariadne, and Phaedra in Latin Poetry, OUP Oxford, 2006. .
 Bell, Robert E., Women of Classical Mythology: A Biographical Dictionary. ABC-Clio. 1991. .
Castriota, David, Myth, Ethos, and Actuality: Official Art in Fifth-century B.C. Athens, Univ of Wisconsin Press, 1992. .
 Collard, Christopher and Martin Cropp (2008a), Euripides Fragments: Aegeus–Meleanger,  Loeb Classical Library No. 504, Cambridge, Massachusetts, Harvard University Press, 2008. . Online version at Harvard University Press.
 Collard, Christopher and Martin Cropp (2008b), Euripides Fragments: Oedipus-Chrysippus: Other Fragments,  Loeb Classical Library No. 506, Cambridge, Massachusetts, Harvard University Press, 2008. . Online version at Harvard University Press.
Dictys Cretensis, The Trojan War. The Chronicles of Dictys of Crete and Dares the Phrygian, translated by R. M. Frazer (Jr.). Indiana University Press. 1966.
 Diodorus Siculus, Diodorus Siculus: The Library of History. Translated by C. H. Oldfather. Twelve volumes. Loeb Classical Library. Cambridge, MA: Harvard University Press; London: William Heinemann, Ltd. 1989. Online version by Bill Thayer
 Euripides, Helen, translated by E. P. Coleridge in  The Complete Greek Drama, edited by Whitney J. Oates and Eugene O'Neill, Jr. Volume 2. New York. Random House. 1938. Online version at the Perseus Digital Library.
 Euripides, Iphigenia in Tauris, translated by Robert Potter in The Complete Greek Drama, edited by Whitney J. Oates and Eugene O'Neill, Jr. Volume 2. New York. Random House. 1938. Online version at the Perseus Digital Library.
 Euripides, Orestes, translated by E. P. Coleridge in The Complete Greek Drama, edited by Whitney J. Oates and Eugene O'Neill, Jr. Volume 1. New York. Random House. 1938. Online version at the Perseus Digital Library.
 Fowler, R. L. (2013), Early Greek Mythography: Volume 2: Commentary, Oxford University Press, 2013. .
 Gantz, Timothy, Early Greek Myth: A Guide to Literary and Artistic Sources, Johns Hopkins University Press, 1996, Two volumes:  (Vol. 1),  (Vol. 2).
Garagin, M., P. Woodruff, Early Greek Political thought from Homer to the Sophists, Cambridge 1995. .
 Grimal, Pierre, The Dictionary of Classical Mythology, Wiley-Blackwell, 1996, .
 Hard, Robin, The Routledge Handbook of Greek Mythology: Based on H.J. Rose's "Handbook of Greek Mythology", Psychology Press, 2004, . Google Books.
Homer, Homeri Opera, five volumes, Oxford, Oxford University Press. 1920.
 Homer, The Iliad with an English Translation by A.T. Murray, Ph.D. in two volumes. Cambridge, MA., Harvard University Press; London, William Heinemann, Ltd. 1924. Online version at the Perseus Digital Library.
 Homer, The Odyssey with an English Translation by A.T. Murray, PH.D. in two volumes. Cambridge, MA., Harvard University Press; London, William Heinemann, Ltd. 1919. Online version at the Perseus Digital Library.
 Hyginus, Gaius Julius, Astronomica, in The Myths of Hyginus, edited and translated by Mary A. Grant, Lawrence: University of Kansas Press, 1960. Online version at ToposText.
 Most, G.W., Hesiod: The Shield, Catalogue of Women, Other Fragments, Loeb Classical Library, No. 503, Cambridge, Massachusetts, Harvard University Press, 2007, 2018. . Online version at Harvard University Press.
 Ovid, Ars Amatoria in Art of Love. Cosmetics. Remedies for Love. Ibis. Walnut-tree. Sea Fishing. Consolation. Translated by J. H. Mozley. Revised by G. P. Goold. Loeb Classical Library No. 232, Cambridge, MA: Harvard University Press, 1929. Online version at Harvard University Press.
 Parada, Carlos, Genealogical Guide to Greek Mythology, Jonsered, Paul Åströms Förlag, 1993. .
 Pausanias, Pausanias Description of Greece with an English Translation by W.H.S. Jones, Litt.D., and H.A. Ormerod, M.A., in 4 Volumes. Cambridge, MA, Harvard University Press; London, William Heinemann Ltd. 1918. Online version at the Perseus Digital Library.
Plato, Plato in Twelve Volumes, Vol. 12 translated by Harold N. Fowler, Cambridge, MA, Harvard University Press; London, William Heinemann Ltd. 1921.
 Maehler, H. Bacchylides: A Selection, Cambridge University Press, 2004. .
 Servius, In Vergilii carmina comentarii. Servii Grammatici qui feruntur in Vergilii carmina commentarii; recensuerunt Georgius Thilo et Hermannus Hagen. Georgius Thilo. Leipzig. B. G. Teubner. 1881.
McHardy, FIona, The 'trial by water' in Greek myth and literature, LICS 7.1 (December 2008). PDF
 Sophocles, Ajax in Sophocles. Ajax. Electra. Oedipus Tyrannus. Edited and translated by Hugh Lloyd-Jones. Loeb Classical Library No. 20. Cambridge, MA, Harvard University Press, 1994. . Online version at Harvard University Press.
 Sophocles, The Ajax of Sophocles. Edited with introduction and notes by Sir Richard Jebb, Sir Richard Jebb. Cambridge. Cambridge University Press. 1893 Online version at the Perseus Digital Library.
 Strabo, Geography, translated by Horace Leonard Jones; Vol. 6, Books 13–14 Cambridge, Massachusetts: Harvard University Press; London: William Heinemann, Ltd. (1924). .
 Thucydides, Thucydides translated into English; with introduction, marginal analysis, notes, and indices. Volume 1, Benjamin Jowett. translator. Oxford. Clarendon Press. 1881.
 Tripp, Edward, Crowell's Handbook of Classical Mythology, Thomas Y. Crowell Co; First edition (June 1970). .
Smith, William; Dictionary of Greek and Roman Biography and Mythology, London (1873).
Tzetzes, John, Allegories of the Iliad translated by Goldwyn, Adam J. and Kokkini, Dimitra. Dumbarton Oaks Medieval Library, Harvard University Press, 2015. .
 Webster, Thomas Bertram Lonsdale, The Tragedies of Euripides, Methuen & Co, 1967 .
 Wright, Matthew, The Lost Plays of Greek Tragedy (Volume 1): Neglected Authors, Bloomsbury Publishing, 2016. .

Princesses in Greek mythology
Queens in Greek mythology
Cretan characters in Greek mythology
Mythology of Argos